Choi Sol-gyu (born 5 August 1995) is a South Korean badminton player. He was a part of the Korean national team that won the 2017 Sudirman Cup.

Career 
Choi has been best known as a mixed doubles player since his back-to-back titles at the Asian Junior Championships in 2012 and 2013. However, as a junior, he was also successful in boys' singles, in which he won the under-17 title at the 2011 Surabaya Cup, and the Malaysia International Youth U19 in both 2012 and 2013.

Choi competed at the 2020 Summer Olympics in the men's doubles partnering Seo Seung-jae. His pace at the Games was stopped in the group stage.

Achievements

East Asian Games 
Mixed doubles

World University Championships 
Men's doubles

BWF World Junior Championships 
Mixed doubles

Asian Junior Championships 
Mixed doubles

BWF World Tour (4 titles, 4 runners-up) 
The BWF World Tour, which was announced on 19 March 2017 and implemented in 2018, is a series of elite badminton tournaments sanctioned by the Badminton World Federation (BWF). The BWF World Tour is divided into levels of World Tour Finals, Super 1000, Super 750, Super 500, Super 300, and the BWF Tour Super 100.

Men's doubles

Mixed doubles

BWF Grand Prix (4 titles, 6 runners-up) 
The BWF Grand Prix had two levels, the Grand Prix and Grand Prix Gold. It was a series of badminton tournaments sanctioned by the Badminton World Federation (BWF) and played between 2007 and 2017.

Mixed doubles

  BWF Grand Prix Gold tournament
  BWF Grand Prix tournament

BWF International Challenge/Series (4 titles, 1 runner-up) 
Men's doubles

Mixed doubles

  BWF International Challenge tournament
  BWF International Series tournament

References

External links 

 
 

1995 births
Living people
Badminton players from Seoul
South Korean male badminton players
Badminton players at the 2020 Summer Olympics
Olympic badminton players of South Korea
Badminton players at the 2018 Asian Games
Asian Games competitors for South Korea